Drum sequencer can refer to:

In electronic music:
 Drum machine

In electromechanical controllers:
 Drum sequencer (controller)
 A cam timer controller device